Rangitata Island Aerodrome is a small airfield located on Rangitata Island halfway between Timaru and Ashburton. It is owned and operated by the Brodie family and is home to the Geraldine Flying Group, De Havillands over New Zealand collection, New Zealand Microlight heritage museum, Shadows of Hawks World War I replica collection and the Ross Brodie Memorial museum and library.

External links
NZ AIP vol 4: NZRI - Rangitata Island Aerodrome
Rangitata Island Aerodrome

Airports in New Zealand
Timaru District
Buildings and structures in Canterbury, New Zealand